Horizon Records was an American independent record label founded in 1960 by Dave Hubert.

Horizon was originally a folk and blues label distributed by World Pacific Records. When Liberty Records acquired World Pacific in 1965, it also took over the distribution of Horizon. From 1974–1978 the label became a subsidiary imprint of A&M Records for issuing jazz. and pop, During this period, the label was known for producing albums with high-quality audio and packaging. The catalogue includes albums by Dave Brubeck, Ornette Coleman, Paul Desmond, Charlie Haden, and Jim Hall. John Snyder, the founder of the label, left in 1977 and started Artists House.

In 1979 Horizon struck gold with debut albums by Brenda Russell and the Yellow Magic Orchestra. By 1980, the label disappeared. In 1984, A&M went into a deal with Word Distribution, giving more powerful distribution for Word's labels, such as Myrrh Records, Word Records, and Exit Records. Horizon was reactivated with its 1979 artwork intact as a Christian label, with the Imperials, while Myrrh artist Amy Grant signed directly with A&M. By 1987, Horizon had disappeared a second time. Horizon's jazz catalogue is now managed by Verve Records.

A different label for Christian and gospel music was launched in 1992 with releases by the Kingsmen Quartet and the McKameys by Crossroads Music.

Discography

See also 
 List of record labels

References

American record labels
Record labels established in 1960
Record labels disestablished in 1987
Blues record labels
Folk record labels
Jazz record labels
Verve Records labels
A&M Records